Young Ladies Beside the Seine (Summer) (French - Les Demoiselles des bords de la Seine (été)) is an oil on canvas painting by Gustave Courbet. He painted it between late 1856 and early 1857 and presented it to the Paris Salon jury, which accepted it and exhibited it on 15 June 1857 with two portraits and three landscapes by the same artist. 

It was bought by Courbet's friend and patron Étienne Baudry (1830-1908), then left by him to the painter's sister Juliette, who left it to the French state in 1906. It now hangs in the Petit Palais in Paris. A smaller (96.5 x 130 cm) sketch version is now in the National Gallery, London.

Paintings by Gustave Courbet
1857 paintings
Collections of the National Gallery, London
Paintings in the collection of the Petit Palais